The Las Vegas International Film and Screenplay Festival (LVIFSF) is a film festival held annually in Las Vegas, Nevada. Founded in 2015 (as the Las Vegas International Film and Screenwriting Contest), the festival was previously based at the Palms Casino Resort, with screenings of selected films held in nearby theaters and screening rooms. The festival also grants awards by genre, technical discipline, and lifetime achievement over two nights during the program.

In 2020, the festival program was moved to a virtual format due to the COVID-19 pandemic. On August 21, 2021, the festival announced it would once again host the program, including screenings, virtually.

The Las Vegas International Film and Screenplay Festival is directed by Annette Hull, documentary filmmaker and former General Manager of the Tri-Cities Rattlers football organization in the Northwest Football League. Notable past honorees include Academy Award-nominee Eric Roberts and Emmy Award-winner Michael Learned, and 2019 indie breakout Princess of the Row, starring Martin Sheen.

Sections 
The Las Vegas International Film and Screenplay Festival official program is divided into two sections: film and written word. Entries are submitted and judged separately, by section, with Official Selections named for each. Honors and awards are bestowed in separate ceremonies on different nights during the festival.

Awards 
Jury awards are presented in a number of genre, performance, and technical categories, over two nights, with one ceremony per section.

Film

Written Word

Special Awards

Lifetime Achievement 
In 2019, the Festival announced the creation of a lifetime achievement award to be awarded to an artist of renown, with substantial contributions to the industry. In 2019, the program honored actress and four-time Emmy Award-winner Michael Learned with the inaugural award. The award was not given in 2020, due to the cancellation of all in-person events and ceremonies.

Writer of the Year 
In 2019, the Festival presented a "Writer of the Year" honor to Harold Brown.

Audience Award 
Some films presented during the Festival are eligible for Audience Awards. After screening an eligible film, audience members are invited to vote in audience award categories. At the November 2021 edition of the festival, Benjamin Bryant's psychological drama Station to Station received the Audience Award.

References

External links 

 Las Vegas International Film and Screenwriting Festival Official Website
 Las Vegas International Film and Screenwriting Festival profile on FilmFreeway 
 Las Vegas International Film and Screenwriting Festival on IMDb.com

2015 establishments in the United States
Film festivals established in 2015
American film awards
Film festivals in Nevada
Events in Las Vegas